The Waynesboro Area Senior High School is a midsized, suburban public high school located in Franklin County, Pennsylvania. It is the sole high school operated by the Waynesboro Area School District. It serves the boroughs of Waynesboro and Mont Alto, as well as all of Washington Township and Quincy Township, and a portion of Guilford Township. In 2013, enrollment was reported as 1,272 pupils in 9th through 12th grades. Waynesboro Area Senior High School employed 87 teachers. Per the PA Department of Education 1% of the teachers were rated "Non‐Highly Qualified" under the federal No Child Left Behind Act.

Students may choose to attend Franklin Virtual Academy which is an online education program operated by a cooperative agreement of local Franklin County public school districts. Additionally, students may choose to attend Franklin County Career and Technology Center for training in the construction, mechanical trades. web development and technology careers, culinary arts, landscaping, cosmetology,  and allied health services.

Extracurriculars
The Waynesboro Area School District offers a variety of clubs, activities and an extensive sports program.

Sports
The district funds:

Boys
Baseball AAAA
Basketball- AAAA
Cross country AAA
Football AAAA
Golf AAA
Soccer AAA
Track and field AAA
Wrestling AAA

Girls
Basketball AAAA
Cross country AAA
Field hockey AAA
Golf AAA
Gymnastics AAAA
Soccer AAA
Softball AAA
Track and field AAA
Volleyball AAA
Cheerleading  AAA

Middle school sports

Boys
Basketball
Football
Soccer
Track and field
Wrestling

Girls
Basketball
Field hockey
Soccer
Track and field
Volleyball

According to PIAA directory July 2013

Notable alumni
 Lil Skies, rapper

References

Public high schools in Pennsylvania
Schools in Franklin County, Pennsylvania